Karchak-e Navai (also Romanized as Karchak-e Navā’ī) is a village in Ahlamerestaq-e Jonubi Rural District, in the Central District of Mahmudabad County, Mazandaran Province, Iran. At the 2006 census, its population was 242, in 60 families.

References 

Populated places in Mahmudabad County